Octanediol may refer to:

 1,2-Octanediol, also known as caprylyl glycol
 1,8-Octanediol, also known as octamethylene glycol